Issawa Singthong (born October 10, 1980) is a Thai football coach and former professional footballer. He was the former Midfield of Thailand national team since 2002 to 2004.

Honours

Club
Royal Thai Air Force F.C.
 Thai Premier League Champion (1) : 1999
 Thai FA Cup Winnres (1) : 2001

SQC Bình Định F.C.
 Vietnamese Cup Winnres (2) : 2003, 2004

International
Thailand U-23
 Tiger Cup Winnres (1) : 2002
 Southeast Asian Games  Gold Medal (1); 2003

References

1980 births
Living people
Issawa Singthong
Issawa Singthong
Association football midfielders
Issawa Singthong
Binh Dinh FC players
An Giang FC players
Issawa Singthong
Dong Thap FC players
Issawa Singthong
Issawa Singthong
Issawa Singthong
Issawa Singthong
Issawa Singthong
Thai expatriate footballers
V.League 1 players
Thai expatriate sportspeople in Vietnam
Expatriate footballers in Vietnam
Issawa Singthong
Footballers at the 2002 Asian Games
2004 AFC Asian Cup players
Southeast Asian Games medalists in football
Issawa Singthong
Competitors at the 2003 Southeast Asian Games
Issawa Singthong